The following is an alphabetical list of articles related to the Philippine capital region of Metro Manila.

0–9 

 10th Avenue, Caloocan
 1880 Luzon earthquakes
 2012 Metro Manila flooding
 5th Avenue station (Line 1)

A 
 Abad Santos Avenue
 Abad Santos station
 Abalos, Benjamin
 Abalos, Benjamin Jr.
 ADB Avenue
 Adjacent provinces:
 Bulacan
 Cavite
 Laguna
 Rizal
 Adjacent regions:
 Calabarzon
 Central Luzon
 Administrative divisions of Metro Manila
 Adriatico Street
 AFP Joint Task Force-National Capital Region
 Airports in the Greater Manila Area
 Alabang
 Alabang railway station
 Alabang Town Center
 Alabang–Zapote Road
 Amorsolo Street
 Anda Circle
 Andres Bonifacio Avenue
 Andrés Bonifacio Monument
 Andrews Avenue
 Annual events in Metro Manila
 Anonas station (Line 2)
 Anonas Street
 Araneta City
 Araneta Center–Cubao station (Line 2)
 Araneta Center–Cubao station (Line 3)
 Arca South
 Arch of the Centuries
 Arcovia City
 Arellano, Juan
 Ark Avilon Zoo
 Arkong Bato
 Arnaiz Avenue
 Arroceros Forest Park
 Art Deco theaters in Metro Manila
 Aseana City
 Aserradora Mecánica de Tuason y Sampedro
 Assassination of Benigno Aquino, Jr.
 Atienza, Lito
 Aurora Boulevard
 Ayala Alabang
 Ayala Avenue
 Ayala Bridge
 Ayala Center
 Ayala station
 Ayala Triangle Gardens
 Ayuntamiento de Manila
 Azcárraga, Marcelo

B 
 Baclaran
 Baclaran Church
 Baclaran station
 Bagatsing, Ramon
 Bagong Pag-asa
 Bagong Silang
 Bagong Silangan
 Bagumbayan North
 Bagumbayan South
 Balangkas
 Balara Filters Park
 Balete Drive
 Balingasa
 Balintawak station
 Bambang, Taguig
 Bambang station
 Bamboo Organ
 Bangkulasi
 Barangays of Metro Manila
 Barangka
 Batasan Hills
 Batasan Road
 Batasan–San Mateo Road
 Batasang Pambansa
 Battle of Bangkusay Channel
 Battles of La Naval de Manila
 Battle of Manila
 Battle of Manila Bay
 Battle of Zapote River
 Bautista, Cipriano
 Bautista, Herbert
 Bay City, Metro Manila
 Bayanan, Muntinlupa
 Baywalk
 Beaches in the Greater Manila Area
 Bel-Air Village
 Belmonte, Feliciano Jr.
 Benavides, Miguel de
 Bernardo, Ponciano
 Bernardo Park
 Betty Go-Belmonte station
 Betty Go-Belmonte Street
 BF Homes Parañaque
 BF International Village
 Bicutan Automated Guideway Transit System
 Bicutan railway station
 Bignay
 Binay, Elenita
 Binay, Jejomar
 Binay, Jejomar Jr.
 Binondo
 Binondo–Intramuros Bridge
 Bisig
 Black Nazarene
 Blanco, Francisco Manuel
 Blumentritt station (Line 1)
 Blumentritt railway station
 Blumentritt Road
 Boni Avenue
 Boni station
 Bonifacio, Andrés
 Bonifacio Capital District
 Bonifacio Drive
 Bonifacio Global City
 Bonifacio High Street
 Bonifacio Monument
 Bonifacio Shrine
 Bonny Serrano Avenue
 Bridgetowne
 British invasion of Manila
 Buendia station
 Buendia railway station
 Buli, Muntinlupa
 Bungad
 Bunye, Ignacio
 Bureau of Fire Protection National Capital Region
 Bureau of Jail Management and Penology Regional Office - National Capital Region

C 
 Caballo Island
 Caloocan
 Calumpang
 Camp Aguinaldo
 Camp Atienza
 Camp Crame
 Capitol Commons
 Carlos, Emerson
 Carlos, Jose Emmanuel
 Carmona
 Carriedo Fountain
 Carriedo station
 Casa Manila
 Casino Español de Manila
 Cayetano, Lani
 Celestino, Canuto E.
 Cemeteries in Metro Manila
 Central Signal, Taguig
 Central Terminal station (Line 1)
 Century City, Makati
 Chavacano
 Chino Roces Avenue
 Cinemas in Metro Manila
 Circuit Makati
 Circulo Verde
 Circumferential Road 1
 Circumferential Road 2
 Circumferential Road 3
 Circumferential Road 4
 Circumferential Road 5
 Circumferential Road 6
 City of Dreams Manila
 City of Greater Manila
 City of Man
 Club Filipino
 Coat of arms of Manila
 Coconut Palace
 Commonwealth Avenue
 Compañía General de Tabacos de Filipinas
 Conspiracy of the Maharlikas
 Cornejo, Miguel
 Corregidor
 Crossings of the Pasig River
 Crossings of the Marikina River
 Cruz-Araneta, Gemma
 Cruz-Herrera, Arsenio
 Cry of Pugad Lawin
 Cultural Center of the Philippines Complex
 Cultural Properties of the Philippines in Metro Manila
 Cuneta, Pablo
 Cupang

D 
 Daang Hari Road
 Daanghari
 Dagala, Bernardo O.
 Dalandanan
 Dasmariñas Village
 De Guzman, Del
 De los Santos, Epifanio
 Del Pilar Street
 Dewey, George
 Diario de Manila
 Diego Cera Avenue
 Domestic Road
 Don Bosco, Parañaque
 Don Galo
 Doña Soledad Avenue
 Doroteo Jose station
 Dr. Santos Avenue

E 
 Eastern Police District
 Eastwood City
 EDSA
 EDSA station (Line 1)
 EDSA railway station
 EDSA Shrine
 EDSA III
 Ejercito, JV
 El Deposito
 El Fraile Island
 Elliptical Road
 Elpidio Quirino Avenue
 Entertainment City
 Ermita
 Escolta Street
 España Boulevard
 España railway station
 Estrada, Joseph
 Estrella Street
 Eton Centris

F 
 Far Eastern Championship Games
 Far Eastern University 
 Fernando, Bayani
 Fernando, Marides
 Filinvest City
 Filipino language
 Fire District II
 Fire District III
 Fire District IV
 Forbes Park
 Fort Bonifacio
 Fort Bonifacio (barangay)
 Fort San Antonio Abad
 Fort Santiago
 Fort William McKinley
 Freedom Island
 FTI railway station

G 
 Gambling in Metro Manila
 Gatchalian, Rexlon
 Gatchalian, Sherwin
 Gates of Intramuros
 Geography of Manila
 Gil Puyat Avenue
 Gil Puyat station
 Gilmore Avenue
 Gilmore station (Line 2)
 Ginebra San Miguel
 Glorieta Park
 Goiti, Martin de
 Golden Mosque
 Gomez, Guia
 Gonzales, Neptali II
 Governor Pascual Avenue
 Greater Manila Area
 Greenfield District
 Greenhills (mixed-use development)
 Gregorio Araneta Avenue
 Guadalupe Nuevo
 Guadalupe station (Line 3)
 Guerrero, León María
 Guinto, Leon

H 
 Harbor Defenses of Manila and Subic Bays
 Harper, Bambi
 Harrison Avenue
 Harrison Plaza
 Harrison, Francis Burton
 Hidalgo Street
 Historical markers of the Philippines in Metro Manila
 History of Manila
 Hospicio de San Jose
 Hospitals in Metro Manila
 Hotels in Metro Manila
 Huerta, Felix

I 
 Imperial Manila
 Inocentes, Oscar
 Insular Ice Plant
 Intramuros
 Isla
 Isla de Convalecencia
 Isla Pulo
 Islands in the Greater Manila Area

J 
 J.P. Rizal Avenue
 J. Ruiz station
 Jamboree Lake
 Joaquin, Nick
 Jones Bridge
 Jose Diokno Boulevard
 Jose Laurel Street
 José María of Manila
 Juan Ruiz Street
 Julia Vargas Avenue

K 
 Kalaw Avenue
 Kalayaan Avenue
 Kamuning station
 Karuhatan
 Katipunan Avenue
 Katipunan station (Line 2)
 KidZania Manila
 Krus na Ligas

L 
 La Huerta
 La Loma Cemetery
 La Mesa Dam and Reservoir
 La Mesa Watershed Reservation
 La Monja Island
 Lacson Avenue
 Lacson, Arsenio
 Laguna de Bay
 Laguna Lake Development Authority
 Lakandula
 Land reclamation in Metro Manila
 Laong Laan railway station
 Las Piñas
 Las Piñas Church
 Las Piñas–Parañaque Critical Habitat and Ecotourism Area
 Lawang Bato
 Lawton Avenue
 Legarda station
 Legarda Street
 Legazpi, Miguel López de
 Legazpi Active Park
 Legislative districts of Caloocan
 Legislative district of Las Piñas
 Legislative districts of Makati
 Legislative district of Malabon
 Legislative district of Mandaluyong
 Legislative districts of Manila
 Legislative districts of Marikina
 Legislative district of Muntinlupa
 Legislative district of Navotas
 Legislative districts of Parañaque
 Legislative district of Pasay
 Legislative district of Pasig
 Legislative district of Pateros-Taguig
 Legislative districts of Quezon City
 Legislative district of San Juan, Metro Manila
 Legislative district of Taguig
 Legislative districts of Valenzuela
 Letre Road
 Libertad station
 Libingan ng mga Bayani
 Libraries in Metro Manila
 Light Rail Manila Corporation
 Light Rail Transit Authority
 Lim, Alfredo
 Liwasang Bonifacio
 Lopez, Mel
 Luneta Hotel

M 
 Ma Mon Luk
 Mabini Bridge
 Macapagal Boulevard
 MacArthur Highway
 Magallanes Interchange
 Magallanes station
 Magat Salamat
 Magsaysay Boulevard
 Maharlika Village
 Makati
 Makati Avenue
 Makati Business Club
 Makati Central Business District
 Makati Park and Garden
 Makati Poblacion
 Makati Poblacion Park
 Malabon
 Malabon People's Park
 Malacañang Palace
 Malanday
 Malapitan, Oscar
 Malate, Manila
 Malate Church
 Malonzo, Rey
 Mandaluyong
 Mangangate River
 Manggahan Floodway
 Manila
 Manila (province)
 Manila American Cemetery and Memorial
 Manila Army and Navy Club
 Manila Bay
 Manila Cathedral
 Manila Central Post Office
 Manila Chinese Cemetery
 Manila City Council
 Manila City Hall
 Manila Commodity Exchange
 Manila Elks Club
 Manila Film Center
 Manila Fire District
 Manila galleon
 Manila Grand Opera House
 Manila hostage crisis
 Manila Hotel
 Manila International Airport Authority
 Manila Jai Alai Building
 Manila Light Rail Transit System
 Manila massacre
 Manila Metro Rail Transit System
 Manila Metropolitan Theater
 Manila Mint
 Manila North Cemetery
 Manila Observatory
 Manila Ocean Park
 Manila Police District
 Manila (song)
 Manila Sound
 Manila South Cemetery
 Manila Thermal Power Plant
 Manila Water
 Manila Zoo
 Manila–Cavite Expressway
 Mapúa, Tomás
 Marcos, Imelda
 Marcos Road
 Marikina
 Marikina Heights
 Marikina River
 Marikina River Park
 Marikina Valley Fault System
 Marikina–Infanta Highway
 Marquez, Joey
 Mathay, Mel
 Maynila (historical polity)
 Maynilad Water Services
 Maysan Road
 McKinley Road
 Mega Manila
 Mega Manila Subway
 Mehan Garden
 Mendiola Street
 Meralco
 Meralco Avenue
 Metro Manila  website
 :Category:Metro Manila
commons:Category:Metro Manila
commons:Category:Maps of Metro Manila
 Metro Manila Dream Plan
 Metro Manila Film Festival
 Metro Manila Popular Music Festival
 Metro Rail Transit Corporation
 Metropolitan Manila Development Authority
 Metropolitan mountaineering society
 Metropolitan Waterworks and Sewerage System
 Mindanao Avenue
 Molino Dam
 Monumento station
 Morato, Tomas
 Morong District
 Muntinlupa
 Muntinlupa Poblacion
 Muntinlupa railway station
 Muntinlupa Sunken Garden
 Muntinlupa–Cavite Expressway
 Museums in Metro Manila

N 
 NAIA Expressway
 NAIA Road
 Nakpil, Carmen Guerrero
 Namayan
 Namayan, Mandaluyong
 Napindan
 National Capital Region Police Office
 National Capital Regional Command
 National Center for Mental Health
 Navotas
 Navotas Centennial Park
 Navotas East
 Navotas West
 New Bilibid Prison
 New Lower Bicutan
 Newport City, Metro Manila
 Newspapers published in Metro Manila
 Nicanor Garcia Street
 Nichols Field
 Nichols railway station
 Nicknames of Manila
 Nielson Field
 Nilad plant
 Ninoy Aquino Avenue 
 Ninoy Aquino International Airport
 Ninoy Aquino Parks & Wildlife Center
 North Avenue
 North Avenue station (Line 3)
 North Bay Boulevard
 North Luzon Expressway
 North Port Passenger Terminal
 Northbay Boulevard North
 Northbay Boulevard South
 Northern Police District
 Novales, Andrés
 Nuestra Señora del Buen Suceso de Parañaque

O 
 Ocampo, Ambeth
 Ocampo, Fernando H.
 Old Legislative Building
 Onse, San Juan
 Orbos, Thomas
 Oreta, Tito
 Ortigas Avenue
 Ortigas Center
 Ortigas Interchange
 Ortigas station (Line 3)
 Our Lady of La Naval de Manila

P 
 Pablo Ocampo Street
 Paco, Manila
 Paco Park
 Paco railway station
 Padre Burgos Avenue
 Padre Faura Street
 Palasan
 Pandacan
 Pandacan railway station
 Pancit Malabon
 Parañaque
 Parañaque Cathedral
 Parañaque River
 Parián (Manila)
 Pariancillo Villa
 Parks in Metro Manila
 Parklinks
 Pasay
 Pasay Road railway station
 Paseo de Roxas
 Pasig
 Pasig Cathedral
 Pasig Rainforest Park
 Pasig River
 Pasig River Ferry
 Pasig River Light
 Pasig River Rehabilitation Commission
 Paterno, Dolores
 Pateros
 Payatas
 Pedro Gil station
 Pedro Gil Street
 People from Metro Manila
 People's Park (Valenzuela)
 People Power Monument
 People Power Revolution
 PH-00 – ISO 3166-2:PH region code for the National Capital Region of Metro Manila
 Philippine Constabulary Metropolitan Command
 Philippine International Convention Center
 Philippine National Railways
 Philippines–Thailand Friendship Circle
 Pinaglabanan Shrine
 Pinagsama
 Pinyahan
 Pioneer Street
 Pitogo, Makati
 Plaza de Armas
 Plaza Dilao
 Plaza de España
 Plaza Lacson
 Plaza de Mexico
 Plaza Miranda
 Plaza Moraga
 Plaza Moriones
 Plaza Rajah Sulayman
 Plaza de Roma
 Plaza San Lorenzo Ruiz
 PNR Metro South Commuter Line
 Polo
 Pollution of the Pasig River
 Port Area, Manila
 Port of Manila
 Post of Manila
 Prehistory of Manila
 Public transport in Metro Manila
 Puente Colgante
 Puente de España
 Punturin
 Pureza station
 Pureza Street
 Putatan

Q 
 Quezon Avenue
 Quezon Avenue station (Line 3)
 Quezon Boulevard
 Quezon City
 Quezon City Fire District
 Quezon City Police District
 Quezon Memorial Circle
 Quiapo, Manila
 Quiapo Church
 Quirino Avenue
 Quirino Grandstand
 Quirino Highway
 Quirino station (Line 1)

R 
 R. Papa station
 Radial Road 1
 Radial Road 2
 Radial Road 3
 Radial Road 4
 Radial Road 5
 Radial Road 6
 Radial Road 7
 Radial Road 8
 Radial Road 9
 Radial Road 10
 Radio stations in Metro Manila
 Rail transit stations in the Greater Manila Area
 Rajah Matanda
 Rajah Sulayman
 Real Audiencia of Manila
 Recto Avenue
 Recto station
 Regalado Highway
 Rehabilitation of the Pasig River
 Religious buildings in Metro Manila
 Remedios Circle
 Resorts World Manila
 Riverbanks Center
 Rivers and estuaries in Metro Manila
 Rizal
 Rizal Avenue
 Rizal Day bombings
 Rizal Memorial Sports Complex
 Rizal Monument
 Rizal Park
 Rizal Shrine
 Roads in Metro Manila
 Robinsons Cybergate
 Rockwell Center
 Rodriguez, Eulogio
 Roman Catholic Archdiocese of Manila
 Roman Catholic churches in Metro Manila
 Roman Catholic Diocese of Antipolo
 Roman Catholic Diocese of Cubao
 Roman Catholic Diocese of Imus
 Roman Catholic Diocese of Kalookan
 Roman Catholic Diocese of Malolos
 Roman Catholic Diocese of Novaliches
 Roman Catholic Diocese of Parañaque
 Roman Catholic Diocese of Pasig
 Roman Catholic Diocese of San Pablo
 Roosevelt Avenue
 Roosevelt station (Line 1)
 Roxas Boulevard
 Ruiz, Lorenzo

S 
 Salcedo, Juan de
 Salcedo Park
 Salonga, Asiong
 Sampaloc, Manila
 Sampaloc Church
 Samson Road
 Sangley Rebellion
 San Agustin Church
 San Andres, Manila
 San Andres railway station
 San Antonio, Parañaque
 San Antonio, Quezon City
 San Dionisio, Parañaque
 San Isidro, Parañaque
 San Jose, Navotas
 San Juan, Metro Manila
 San Juan River
 San Juan River Bridge
 San Lazaro Tourism and Business Park
 San Martin de Porres, Parañaque
 San Miguel Church
 San Miguel Brewery
 San Miguel Corporation
 San Miguel, Manila
 San Nicolas, Manila
 San Rafael Village
 San Roque, Navotas
 San Sebastian Church
 Santa Ana, Manila
 Santa Ana, Taguig
 Santa Ana Church
 Santa Ana Historic Houses
 Santa Cruz, Manila
 Santa Cruz, Quezon City
 Santa Cruz Bridge
 Santa Cruz Church
 Santa Elena, Marikina
 Santa Marta de Pateros
 Santa Mesa
 Santa Mesa railway station
 Santo Niño, Parañaque
 Santo Tomas Internment Camp
 Santolan station (Line 2)
 Santolan station (Line 3)
 Sapang Baho River
 Sarao Motors
 Schools in Metro Manila
 Second EDSA Revolution
 Seng Guan Temple
 Shaw Boulevard
 Shaw Boulevard station
 Shopping malls in Metro Manila
 Sierra Madre (Philippines)
 Singkamas
 Sipac-Almacen
 List of sister cities in Metro Manila
 Skyway
 Slums in Manila
 SM Mall of Asia
 SM Mall of Asia Arena
 Smart Araneta Coliseum
 Smokey Mountain
 Socorro, Quezon City
 Solaire Resort & Casino
 Songs about Manila
 South Avenue, Manila
 South Luzon Expressway
 Southern Police District
 Sporting events in the Greater Manila Area
 Sports venues in the Greater Manila Area
 Star City
 Sucat People's Park
 Sucat railway station

T 
 Taft Avenue
 Taft Avenue station
 Tagalag
 Tagalog language
 Tagalog people
 Taglish
 Tagle, Luis Antonio
 Taguig
 Taguig River
 Takayama, Dom Justo
 Tallest buildings in Metro Manila
 Tambo
 Tandang Sora Avenue
 Tanduay
 Tanghalang Francisco Balagtas
 Tanghalang Pambansa
 Tangos
 Tangos North
 Tangos South
 Tanza
 Tayuman station
 Tayuman Street
 Theaters and concert halls in Metro Manila
 Thirteen Martyrs of Bagumbayan
 Thrilla in Manila
 Tiangco, John Rey
 Tiangco, Toby
 Timeline of Manila
 Timog Avenue
 Tinajeros
 Tiñga, Sigfrido
 Tolentino, Francis
 Tomas Morato Avenue
 Tondo, Manila
 Tondo (historical polity)
 Tondo Church
 Tourism in Metro Manila
 Tramo Street
 Transportation in Metro Manila
 Treaty of Manila
 Triangle Park
 Tugatog
 Tuktukan
 Tullahan River
 Tunasan
 Tunasan River
 Tutuban Center
 Tutuban railway station

U 
 Ugong
 Unified Vehicular Volume Reduction Program
 United Nations Avenue
 United Nations station
 Universities and colleges in Metro Manila
 University Belt
 University of the Philippines Arboretum
 University of the Philippines Diliman Automated Guideway Transit System
 University of Santo Tomas
 UP Village
 Upper Bicutan
 U.S. Naval Radio Facility Bagobantay

V 
 V. Mapa station
 Valentino, Rodolfo B.
 Valenzuela
 Vargas, Jorge B.
 Veinte Reales
 Veterans Village
 Victorino Mapa Street
 Vidal, Sebastián
 Villamor Air Base
 Villegas, Antonio
 Vito Cruz station

W 
 Washington Sycip Park
 Water privatization in Metro Manila
 Welcome Rotonda
 Western Bicutan
 World Trade Center Metro Manila

X

Y 
 Ynchausti y Compañia

Z 
 Zapote Bridge
 Zapote Line
 Zóbel de Ayala, Enrique
 Zobel Roxas Street
 Zorrilla Theater

See also

Topic overview:
Metro Manila
Outline of Metro Manila

Metro Manila
Metro Manila
Metro Manila-related lists